W.R.: Mysteries of the Organism is a 1971 film by Serbian director Dušan Makavejev that explores the relationship between communist politics and sexuality, as well as presenting the controversial life and work of Austrian-American psychoanalyst Wilhelm Reich (1897–1957). The film's narrative structure is unconventional, intermixing fictional and documentary elements.

After initial screenings, both in and out of Yugoslavia, W.R. was banned in that country for the next 16 years. Makavejev was subsequently indicted there on criminal charges of "derision" towards "the state, its agencies, and representatives" after he made intemperate remarks to a West German newspaper about the ban. His exile from his home country lasted until the end of the regime.

Plot
The film intercuts documentary footage and clips from other films — notably the Stalinist propaganda film The Vow (1946) — with an imaginative and satirical narrative about a highly political Yugoslav woman who seduces a visiting Soviet celebrity ice skater. Despite different settings, characters and time periods, the different elements produce a single story of human sexuality and revolution through montage.

The woman, Milena, violates her proletarian convictions (and rejects the sexual advances of a worker) by pursuing a Joseph Stalin-like celebrity ice skater — Vladimir Ilyich (Lenin's first name and patronymic) — who represents both class oppression and corruption from the West into communist beliefs. She succeeds, with difficulty, in sexual consummation, but V.I. is unable to reconcile his inner conflicts and ends the encounter by decapitating her. Distraught, V.I. sings a Russian song after the murder: "François Villon's Prayer" by Bulat Okudzhava.

Sequences

Tuli Kupferberg
Poet and performance artist Tuli Kupferberg of the band The Fugs, dressed as a soldier, parodies war and the sexual nature of human fascination with guns by stalking affluent New Yorkers on the street and masturbating his toy rifle. The scene is set to The Fugs' 1965 song "Kill for Peace". As part of the film's climax, the gun masturbation imagery is intercut with other orgasmic sequences. This segment highlights Reich's ideas that sexual frustration and violence are connected.

Artists
Artist Betty Dodson discusses her experiences in drawing acts of masturbation, as well as her discussions within consciousness raising groups about female sexual response. The Dodson sequences are relatively straightforward documentary interviews; Dodson's large scale drawing of a man masturbating dominates the background of the shots. This segment illustrates a freer attitude toward sexuality.

New York artist Nancy Godfrey was among a loose group called Plaster Casters, who were known for taking plaster casts of rock stars penises. In a meeting with Jim Buckley, co-founder-editor of the porn magazine Screw, Godfrey makes a plaster cast of Buckley's erect penis as a documentary part of the film. The soundtrack features another song by The Fugs, "I'm Gonna Kill Myself Over Your Dead Body", with Tuli Kupferberg satirically mimicking John Wayne in his a cappella vocals.

This scene was a point of contention for censors. On UK video prints Buckley's penis is covered with psychedelic colors added in editing (the cinema version was unusually approved fully uncut).

Jackie Curtis
Jackie Curtis, a cross-dressing member of Andy Warhol's entourage and star in his films, is shown on the streets of New York enjoying an ice cream cone with a partner. Curtis' appearance highlighted Reich's theories of gender and sexuality.

Screw
Screw was an underground magazine that pioneered in bringing hardcore pornography into the American mainstream during the late 1960s and early 1970s. The film shows a behind-the-scenes look at the publication, in which editor Jim Buckley casually consorts with his nude models. Screw'''s notorious co-founder and editor Al Goldstein is neither seen nor referred to in this sequence.

Alexander Lowen
The film features a rare on-screen interview with neo-Reichian therapist Alexander Lowen, the founder of bioenergetic analysis, during a therapy session, including scream treatment.

Other sequences
Reich's daughter Eva (1924–2008) appears on camera, speaking about her father's work and the sickness of contemporary life.

The Orgonon, Reich's last home and lab near Rangeley, Maine, USA, is seen with brief shots of the interior and exterior, including a cloudbuster.

The film includes re-stagings of scenes from Sergei Eisenstein films, alluding to the montage era of film making in the Soviet Union.

Shots of the incinerator in which Reich's books were burned in New York City are included.

Cast

ReceptionW.R. won acclaim from critics at the Cannes Film Festival in 1971, but due to the state ban was shown only in a few selected audiences in Yugoslavia for the next several years.

See also
 Sweet Movie''
 List of mainstream films with unsimulated sex

References

External links
 
 
. Critique of the film from a Reichian perspective by the director of the Orgone Biophysical Research Lab.
 "WR: Mysteries of the Organism: Anarchist Realism and Critical Quandaries," Richard Porton, LOLA

1971 films
Yugoslav avant-garde and experimental films
1970s fantasy comedy-drama films
Serbian documentary films
Film controversies in Yugoslavia
Film controversies in Germany
Obscenity controversies in film
Serbian fantasy comedy-drama films
German documentary films
Serbo-Croatian-language films
1970s avant-garde and experimental films
West German films
Films about communism
Films about freedom of expression
Films about sexuality
Films directed by Dušan Makavejev
Wilhelm Reich
The Fugs
1971 comedy-drama films
1971 documentary films
1971 comedy films
1971 drama films
Cultural depictions of Serbian people
Cultural depictions of American people
Cultural depictions of Soviet people
Cultural depictions of Joseph Stalin
Yugoslav documentary films
1970s German films